2009 Tokushima Vortis season

Competitions

Player statistics

Other pages
 J. League official site

Tokushima Vortis
Tokushima Vortis seasons